Robert Neal "Bob" Hunter, Jr. (born March 30, 1947) is a North Carolina lawyer and retired  jurist formerly serving on the North Carolina Court of Appeals and on the North Carolina Supreme Court.

A graduate of the University of North Carolina at Chapel Hill and its law school, Hunter is a former chairman of the state board of elections (1985–1989) and a former deputy Attorney General of North Carolina. He was elected to the Court of Appeals in 2008, defeating incumbent John S. Arrowood and receiving 54% of the statewide vote.

Hunter was a candidate for the North Carolina Supreme Court in 2014. Gov. Pat McCrory appointed Hunter to the Supreme Court, effective Sept. 6, and continuing through December 2014, to fill the vacancy created by Mark Martin's elevation to the position of chief justice. Court of Appeals Judge Sam J. Ervin IV defeated Hunter in the November election for a full term. Gov. McCrory then appointed Hunter to fill Ervin's Court of Appeals seat, effective Jan. 1, 2015.

Hunter has also served as an adjunct professor at North Carolina Central University School of Law, Wake Forest University School of Law, Elon University School of Law, and the University of North Carolina at Greensboro.

Hunter received the McNeill Smith Constitutional Rights and Responsibilities Section Award from the North Carolina Bar Association in 2013.

See also
Robert C. Hunter, a similarly named fellow judge of North Carolina Court System's Appellate Division

References

External links
Official Supreme Court site
News & Observer profile page

Living people
1947 births
North Carolina lawyers
North Carolina Republicans
North Carolina Court of Appeals judges
Justices of the North Carolina Supreme Court
University of North Carolina School of Law alumni